Fulvia, an ancient Latin woman's name, may refer to:

People
 People from the ancient Roman Fulvia gens
 Fulvia, a 1st-century BCE Roman woman noted for her political ambitions
 Fulvia Célica, Peruvian transsexual woman
 Fulvia Miani Perotti (1844-1931), Italian writer
 Fulvia Michela Caligiuri (born 1973), Italian politician
 Fulvia Plautilla, a Roman princess
 Fulvia (Wife of Saturninus)
 Olympia Fulvia Morata, a 16th-century Italian scholar

Other
 Fulvia (bivalve), a genus of cockles
 Fulvia (Phrygia), a town of ancient Phrygia, now in Turkey
 609 Fulvia, an asteroid
 Basilica Fulvia, an ancient basilica
 Lancia Fulvia, a car
 MS Fulvia, a Costa Cruises ship (formerly the MS Oslofjord (1949), that was destroyed by fire in 1970